Little Fenton is a settlement and civil parish about 11 miles from York, in the Selby District, in the county of North Yorkshire, England. In 2001 the parish had a population of 87. The parish touches Biggin, Church Fenton and Sherburn in Elmet.

History 
The name "Fenton" means 'Fen farm/settlement', the "Little" part to distinguish from Church Fenton. Church and Little Fenton were recorded in the Domesday Book as Fentun. Little Fenton was a township in the parish of Kirk Fenton (Church Fenton), it became a separate parish in 1866.

References

External links 

 Parish council

Villages in North Yorkshire
Civil parishes in North Yorkshire
Selby District